Farhadabad (also Romanized as Farhādābād; also known as Faraḩābād and Farhādābād Saqi) is a village in Qaleh-ye Mozaffari Rural District, in the Central District of Selseleh County, Lorestan Province, Iran. At the 2006 census, its population was 121, in 19 families.

References 

Towns and villages in Selseleh County